Kalikrishna Mitra (1822 – 2 August 1891) was a Bengali philanthropist, educator and writer. He established the first non-government girls’ school in India.

Early life
Mitra was born to Shibnarayan Mitra in Kolkata, British India. He passed from Hare School and entered into the Presidency College but due to poor economic condition he had to leave his studies and start living in his maternal house at Barasat, presently North 24 Parganas district. His elder brother was a notable doctor, Nabinkrishna Mitra.

Contribution

Mitra involved himself with progressive education movement and several activities relating to some social reforms mainly in Bengal. In 1847 he established a private girls school in Barasat with the help of his brother Nabinkrishna and educationist Peary Charan Sarkar. This was the first school for the girls of aristocratic Hindu families established by any Indian. Initially it was started with only two girls. Kuntibala, daughter of Nabinkrishna is one of them. Although such activities was strongly opposed by Hindu Zaminders and the then conservative society but Ishwar Chandra Vidyasagar and John Elliot Drinkwater Bethune supported Mitra's enormous effort for women education in Bengal. Latter the school was renamed as Kalikrishna Girls' High School. Even Bethune got inspiration for establishment Bethune School in 1849, when he went there for inspection as President of the Council of Education. Mitra organised an agricultural firm of 150 Bighas for scientific farming, plantation and research in Barasat. He brought modern equipment from England for this purpose. He also contributed to spread out for Homeopathy medication.

Literary works
Mitra had knowledge in English literature, philosophy, yoga, history and science. He published various articles in Bengali and English magazines. Mitra wrote few books namely:
 Bama Chikitsa
 Garhasthyobabostha O Shishu Chikitsa
 Pashu Chikitsa

References

Indian schoolteachers
1822 births
1891 deaths
Bengali Hindus
Bengali writers
19th-century Bengalis
Linguists from Bengal
Founders of Indian schools and colleges
Indian reformers
Indian writers
Indian male writers
Indian social workers
Indian social reformers
Indian educators
Indian educational theorists
Educationists from India
Linguists from India
Indian philanthropists
Writers from Kolkata
Widowhood in India
Women's education in India
19th-century Indian linguists
19th-century Indian writers
19th-century Indian male writers
19th-century Indian educators
19th-century Indian philanthropists
19th-century Indian educational theorists
Bengali educators
Educators from West Bengal
Hare School alumni
Presidency University, Kolkata alumni